The Russia women's national rugby union team are the national women's rugby union team of Russia. The side first played as "Russia" in 1994, but its predecessor, the Soviet Union women's national rugby union team played six matches between 1990 and 1991.

History
After the 2022 Russian invasion of Ukraine, World Rugby and Rugby Europe suspended Russia from international and European continental rugby union competition. In addition, the Rugby Union of Russia was suspended from World Rugby and Rugby Europe.

Records (Russia)

Overall

(Full internationals only)

Rugby World Cup

See also
 Soviet Union women's national rugby union team
 Russia national rugby union team

References

External links
 Rugby Union of Russia - Official Site

 
European national women's rugby union teams
Women's rugby union in Russia
Women's national rugby union teams